The 2002 IIHF InLine Hockey World Championship was the sixth IIHF InLine Hockey World Championship, the premier annual international inline hockey tournament. It took place in Nuremberg and Pfaffenhofen an der Ilm, Germany, with the gold-medal game played on July 27, 2002.

Championship

Preliminary round

Group A

Group B

Group C

Group D

Second round
Games against common opponents carried over from preliminary round

Group E

Group F

Group G

Group H

Playoff round

Placement games
15th place game

13th place game

9th-12th place qualifiers

11th place game

9th place game

7th place game

5th place game

Semifinals

Bronze medal game

Gold medal game

References

IIHF InLine Hockey World Championship
2002 in inline hockey